The No. 346 Squadron RAF was a French Air Force bomber squadron given a Royal Air Force squadron number during World War II.

History
The squadron was formed at RAF Elvington on 15 May 1944 from Groupes 2/23 ‘Guyenne’ airmen who had been based in North Africa. It was equipped with British Halifax heavy bomber aircraft and then took part in night bombing raids over Germany.

The squadron  moved to Bordeaux in October 1945 after hostilities had ceased and transferred from RAF to French control on 15 November 1945.

Aircraft operated

References

External links
 Squadron history on the official RAF website

346
Military units and formations established in 1944
Military units and formations disestablished in 1945